Jean-Yves Cousin (born 23 February 1949 in Périers, Manche) was a member of the National Assembly of France.  He represented the Calvados's 6th constituency from 2002 to 2012 as a member of the Union for a Popular Movement. He also served as mayor of Vire between 1989 and 2014.

References

1949 births
Living people
People from Manche
Rally for the Republic politicians
Union for a Popular Movement politicians
Mayors of places in Normandy
Knights of the Ordre national du Mérite
Deputies of the 12th National Assembly of the French Fifth Republic
Deputies of the 13th National Assembly of the French Fifth Republic